Lucien Alcide Constant Brasseur (30 August 1878 – 9 February 1960) was a French sculptor.

Biography
Brasseur was born in Saultain in  the Nord region. He graduated from the École des Beaux-Arts in 1894 and took first prize in the Prix de Rome for sculpture in 1905.

Between the wars, he made memorials for several municipalities in Northern France, including a major monument in Tourcoing and, perhaps his best-known, in Havrincourt, which includes a self-portrait. He also did memorials in Oisy-le-Verger and Saint-Omer and reliefs for the train station in Brest. In 1937, he created a statue for the Palais de Chaillot at the Exposition Universelle.

He is buried at the Cimetière parisien de Bagneux.

Monuments aux morts

Other works

His other works include:

References

1878 births
1960 deaths
People from Nord (French department)
Prix de Rome for sculpture
20th-century French sculptors
French male sculptors